Arthur Hurst may refer to:
Art Hurst (1923–1993), Canadian ice hockey player
Arthur Frederick Hurst (1879–1944), British physician
Arthur Hurst (footballer) (born 1931), Australian rules footballer